Gillicus was a relatively small, 2-metre long ichthyodectiform fish that lived in the Western Interior Seaway, in what is now central North America, during the Late Cretaceous.

Description 
Like its larger relative, Ichthyodectes ctenodon, Gillicus had numerous small teeth lining its jaws, and ate smaller fish by sucking them into its mouth, but the teeth of Gillicus are so small that the jaws appear almost toothless at first, which has led to the suggestion that Gillicus was also a filter-feeder.

Gillicus was also eaten by its own relative, Xiphactinus. The Gillicus bones have not been digested so the larger fish must have died soon after eating its prey. The cause of death may have been due to injuries, such as a ruptured major blood vessel, caused by the fin of the smaller fish as it struggled while being swallowed. This fossil specimen, FHSM VP-333 (the Xiphactinus) and FHSM VP-333 (the Gillicus inside) is known as the “fish-in-a-fish” specimen and was collected by George F. Sternberg in 1952. The specimen can be seen at the Sternberg Museum of Natural History in Hays, Kansas. Gillicus remains are also present in at least two other Xiphactinus specimens.

Nearly all of the Gillicus specimens collected from the Smoky Hill Chalk are adults or subadults, which suggests that the early stages of their life were spent elsewhere.

In 2009 the first specimen of Gillicus from Mexico was described. 

In 2021, the children's book The Plesiosaur's Neck coined the common name "pug fish" for the Gillicus.

References

Ichthyodectiformes
Prehistoric ray-finned fish genera
Coniacian genus first appearances
Campanian genus extinctions
Cretaceous fish of North America